Khour I (Chechen: Эла Ховра), sometimes also referred to as Mokhtsur (Chechen: Мохцур) was a Chechen leader and self proclaimed ruler of the Durdzuks and Alans from 1241 to 1252 as well as the leader of the Insurgency in Durdzuketi. He belonged to the powerful Sado-Orsoy clan.

Family and descendants

 Khasi I
 Atachi
 Khour I
 Chakh
 Khasi II
 Khour II
 Makhama
 Surakat
 Bayr
 Sarka

Early life 
In the early 1200s, he was sent on two major campaigns together with the Georgian commander Ivane Mkhargrdzeli: The first being the invasion and pacification of the region Mingrelia, while the second being the invasion of Circassia.
In the Sadoy village in Southeastern Chechnya, there is a place called "Khovri aul" (Chechen: Ховри аул), which is said to have been the personal estate of Khour.

Mongol invasions of Durdzuketi and Alania

Campaign in Circassia 
Before the start of the Main Mongol campaign of Durdzuketi and Alania, his father, Khasi I, requested the pro-Mongol administrators of Zichia to be under Alan rule, which was denied, after which Khasi sent Khour on another campaign in Circassia, in order to fight the Mongols. However, with the approach of Mongol troops on the capital of Alania and Durdzuketi, Maghas, Khasi recalled the army led by Khour in order to defend the city.

Siege of Maghas 
By the start of the Siege of Maghas in November 1239, Khour I had not yet arrived from his campaign in Zichia. Not long however he arrived, and fought himself through enemy lines, driving a part of the Miongol army away, after which he entered and fortified himself in the city. Although the defence of Maghas was fierce and many attempts by the Mongols to storm the fortress failed, after a major assault on the city in January 1240, led by Batu Khan, Kadan, Güyük, Möngke Khan as well as pro-Mongol Durdzuks such as Matarsha, the city was successfully stormed and eventually captured. This marked the capitulation of Khasi I and the end of the Durdzuk and Alan resistance. Before the attack, Khour's wife and Botur's niece, Esirat, managed to flee the city through a secret passage into Cheberla, Southeastern Chechnya, where she gave birth to Khour's only son–Chakh, sometimes also referred to as Chakhig.

Reign and the Insurgency in Durdzuketi

Prelude 
Right after the capitulation of Khasi I, his choice was rejected by Khour, who believed that the thought of submission was hateful. He raised an army and rebelled against the Mongols. The death of Ögedei Khan in 1241 also marked the beginning of several uprisings across the Mongol Empire, notably Alania, Durdzuketi and Circassia.

Because of the disobedience of Khour, Khasi I was brutally executed by blinding and then quartering. Because of this, up until the Russian conquest of Chechnya and Dagestan, he was considered a holy martyr by the Chechen people.

After the execution of his father, Khour declared himself the sole legitimate heir of Khasi I, and under him, the resistance continued. His older brother, Atachi, became a servant in the Mongol army.

The execution of Khasi was followed by a succession crisis. To restore stability, the Mongols preferred a member of the royal house, Ors/Ars, in Yuan Shi referred to as Ars-Alan. After being put into power, Ors undertook several campaigns to stabilize the land he ousted the Sadoy and Peshkhoy clans, forcing both of them to join Khour's counter campaign in the mountains. Both clans would become the bulk of Khour's army.

Khour started the path of resistance with the renunciation of Christianity and the adoption of a "Military cult", as well as the adoption of a nickname–Mokhtsur.

The insurgency 
Khour was especially active in the Sharo-Orga gorge, where he frequently raided Mongol fortresses and ambushed Mongol armies. Today, this area is called "Mokhtsura b'o t'eba'kkhuna nek' ", meaning "The street (where) Mokhtsur raised an army".

Botur, a pro-Mongol Durdzuk administrator, in order to strengthen his power and authority, undertook a number of tricks in order to further divide the Sado-Orsoy dynasty. As a result of these provocations, a battle between the forces of the Mongols and their allies led by Ors, Botur, Navraz and others against the resistance army led by Khour in 1252.

The Mongols and pro-Mongol Durdzuks gathered their forces and occupied a strong position on Mt. Sadoy-Lam. During the fierce battle that ensued, the forces of Khour failed to capture the mountain and suffered a devatating defeat, which put an end to the insurgency in Durdzuketi.

Death 
Not long after the defeat of Khour's fighters in the Battle of Sadoy-Lam, he was betrayed by Georgian princes, which eventually led to his capture and assassination.

Successor 
A year after is fathers death in 1253, the 13 year old Chakh comes of age: He is crowned. Having become the new leader of the Durdzuks and Alans, Chakh continues the work of his father, the fight against the Mongols. He would later become the main leader of the uprising of the North Caucasians, commonly known as the Dedyakov Rebellion.

See also 

 Mongol invasions of Durdzuketi
 Siege of Maghas
 Khasi I
 Chakhig
 Botur
 Ors Ela
 Mongol invasions of Circassia
 Battle of Sadoy-Lam

References 

Chechen people
Chechen politicians
Lists of 13th-century people
History of Chechnya
History of Ingushetia
13th-century rulers
Assassinated Chechen politicians
1252 deaths
History of the North Caucasus
Nakh peoples
Chechnya
Ingushetia

Literature